The Official Spokesperson of the Ministry of External Affairs is an Indian government official whose primary responsibility is to serve as the spokesperson of the Ministry of External Affairs and to deal with other media affairs relating to Indian foreign policy. The spokesperson is a joint-secretary rank officer, and formally heads the External Publicity division in the Ministry.

Currently, Arindam Bagchi, an officer of the 1995 batch of Indian Foreign Service is the Official Spokesperson of the Ministry of External Affairs.

List of Official Spokespersons

See also 

 Joint secretary to the Government of India
 Spokesperson for the United States Department of State

References 

Civil Services of India
Indian government officials